Acestridium gymnogaster is a species of armored catfish in the genus Acestridium, native to the Madeira River in Brazil.

References

Fish of Brazil
Hypoptopomatini